Othello Molineaux (born 1939) is a jazz steelpan player who spent much of his early career with Jaco Pastorius. He was among the earliest musicians to adapt the steelpan to jazz. He has worked with Monty Alexander, Chicago, and David Johansen.

Career
Born in a family of musicians, his mother being a piano teacher and his father playing the violin, he learned the piano very young, and at the age of eleven began to play the steelpan. He left Trinidad in 1969 and began a career as a pianist, while continuing to play the steelpan. It is with his group mixing steelpan and conventional instruments that he moved to Miami in 1971. There he met bassist Jaco Pastorius and played in 1976 on his first album, which allowed him to appear on the jazz-rock scene. From then on, he would go on to concerts around the world, collaborating with big names in jazz including Dizzy Gillespie, Herbie Hancock, Monty Alexander, Weather Report, Joe Zawinul, Ahmad Jamal.

Othello Molineaux is recognized as having revealed steelpan to jazz as a solo instrument and improvisation, like the piano. He has mainly been an accompanist, notably of Jaco Pastorius, participating in almost all of his albums, and in the tour with the big band Word of Mouth. The latter which will also devote a record to steelpan, Holiday for Pans (1982). Othello Molineaux began his solo career in 1993 with the album It's About Time, on the Big World Music label.

He also collaborated with Habana Abierta on the album Boomerang (2006).

Discography

As leader
 It's About Time (Big World Music, 1993)

As sideman
With Monty Alexander
 Ivory & Steel (Concord Picante, 1980)
 Jamboree (Concord Picante, 1988)
 Caribbean Circle (Chesky, 1992)

With Randy Bernsen
 Music for Planets, People & Washing Machines (Zebra, 1985)
 Mo' Wasabi (Zebra, 1986)
 Paradise Citizens (Zebra, 1988)
 Calling Me Back Home (101 South, 1993)

With Jaco Pastorius
 Jaco Pastorius (Epic, 1976)
 Word of Mouth (Warner Bros., 1981)
 Twins I Aurex Jazz Festival '82 (Warner Bros., 1982)
 Twins II Aurex Jazz Festival '82 (Warner Bros., 1982)
 Invitation (Warner Bros., 1983)
 Holiday for Pans (Sound Hills, 1993)
 The Birthday Concert (Warner Bros., 1995)
 Twins I & II: Live in Japan 1982 (Warner Bros., 1999)
 Holiday for Pans: Full Complete Sessions (Sound Hills, 1999)
 Word of Mouth Band 1983 Japan Tour (Rhino, 2012)
 Modern American Music...Period! The Criteria Sessions (Omnivore, 2014)
 Then & Now (Rhino/Warner, 2016)
 Truth, Liberty & Soul (Resonance, 2017)

With others
 Carles Benavent, Fenix (Nuevos Medios, 1997)
 Debbie Cameron, Be with Me (BMG/Ricochet/RCA Victor, 1996)
 Chicago, Chicago X (Columbia, 1976)
 Eliane Elias, A Long Story (Manhattan, 1991)
 Ahmad Jamal, Nature: The Essence Part III (Birdology/Atlantic, 1998)
 David Johansen, Here Comes the Night (Blue Sky, 1981)
 Jorge Pardo, Huellas (Cabra Road, 2012)
 Roberto Perera, Passions, Illusions & Fantasies (101 South, 1993)
 Michal Urbaniak, Ecstasy (Marlin, 1978)

References

Living people
Jazz drummers
Steelpan musicians
1939 births